The Ambassador of the Republic of the Philippines to New Zealand is the Republic of the Philippines' foremost diplomatic representative in New Zealand. As head of the Philippines' diplomatic mission there, the Ambassador is the official representative of the President and the Government of the Philippines to the Governor-General and the Government of New Zealand. The position has the rank and status of an Ambassador Extraordinary and Plenipotentiary and is based at the embassy located in Wellington, the capital of the country.

The Philippine ambassador to New Zealand is also accredited as a non-resident ambassador to the countries of Cook Islands, Fiji, Samoa, and Tonga.

Heads of mission

Ambassadors

Chargés d’Affaires

See also
List of ambassadors of New Zealand to the Philippines
New Zealand–Philippines relations

References

External links
 

Philippines
New Zealand